The Quarterly Journal of Speech (QJS) is a quarterly peer-reviewed academic journal published by Taylor & Francis on behalf of the National Communication Association. QJS publishes original scholarship and book reviews that take a rhetorical approach to diverse texts, discourses, and cultural practices through which public beliefs, norms, identities, institutions, affects, and actions are constituted, empowered, enacted, and circulated. Rhetorical scholarship traverses and mobilizes many different intellectual, archival, disciplinary, and political vectors, traditions, and methods, and QJS seeks to honor and engage such differences. 

Accordingly, QJS welcomes the full array of scholarship produced under rhetoric’s broad purview, including work that advances and enriches longstanding traditions in rhetorical theory and criticism, as well as research and writing that maps new frontiers.

Abstracting and indexing 
The journal is abstracted and indexed in

External links
 

Quarterly journals
Taylor & Francis academic journals
English-language journals
Publications established in 1915
Communication journals
Academic journals associated with learned and professional societies